Below are abbreviations used in aviation, avionics, aerospace and aeronautics.

A

B

C

D

E

F

G

H

I

J

K

L

M

N

N numbers (turbines)

O

P

Q

R

S

T

U

V

V speeds

W

X

Y

Z

See also
 List of aviation mnemonics
 Avionics
 Glossary of Russian and USSR aviation acronyms
 Glossary of gliding and soaring
 Appendix:Glossary of aviation, aerospace, and aeronautics – Wiktionary

References

Sources
Aerospace acronyms Terms and Glossary
Aviada Terminaro, verkita de Gilbert R. LEDON, 286 pagxoj.

External links 
 Acronyms used by EASA
 Acronyms and Abbreviations - FAA
 Aviation Dictionary
 Aviation Acronyms and Abbreviations
 Acronyms search engine by Eurocontrol

Abbreviations

Glossaries of aviation
Aviation, avionics, aerospace and aeronautical
Aviation, avionics, aerospace and aeronautical
Wikipedia glossaries using tables